Luka Aračić (born 13 March 1981) is a retired Croatian long jumper.

He was born in Zagreb. He finished eighth at the 2000 World Junior Championships, and competed at the 2001 World Championships without reaching the final. He also became Croatian long jump champion in 2000 and 2001.

His personal best jump was 8.12 metres, achieved in June 2001 in Nicosia.

References

1981 births
Living people
Croatian male long jumpers
20th-century Croatian people
21st-century Croatian people